The 2011 Telus Cup was Canada's 33rd annual national midget 'AAA' hockey championship, played April 18–24, 2011 at the Mile One Centre in St. John's, Newfoundland and Labrador. The Winnipeg Thrashers defeated the London Jr. Knights 3–1 in the gold medal game to win their first national title.

Five future National Hockey League players participated in this tournament: Jonathan Drouin, Anthony Duclair, Mike Matheson, tournament scoring leader Sam Reinhart and MVP Alexander Kerfoot.

Teams

Round robin

Standings

Scores

Vancouver 12 – Winnipeg 5
Lac St-Louis 5 – London 4
Halifax 6 – St. John's 3
Winnipeg 2 – Lac St-Louis 0
Vancouver 6 – Halifax 1
St. John's 5 – London 3
Lac St-Louis 9 – Halifax 3
Winnipeg 2 – London 2
Vancouver 4 – St. John's 3
London 2 – Halifax 2
Vancouver 4 – Lac St-Louis 2
St. John's 2 – Winnipeg 2
London 4 – Vancouver 1
Halifax 3 – Winnipeg 3
Lac St-Louis 6 – St. John's 1

Playoffs

Semi-finals
Winnipeg 4 – Lac St-Louis 3 (2OT)
London 4 – Vancouver 3 (OT)

Bronze medal game
Lac St-Louis 5 – Vancouver 3

Gold medal game
Winnipeg 3 – London 1

Individual awards
Most Valuable Player: Alexander Kerfoot (Vancouver)
Top Scorer: Sam Reinhart (Vancouver)
Top Forward: Sam Reinhart (Vancouver)
Top Defenceman: Mike Matheson (Lac St-Louis)
Top Goaltender: Craig Wood (London)
Most Sportsmanlike Player: Marcus Power (St. John's)

Road to the Telus Cup

Atlantic Region
Tournament held March 31–April 3, 2011 at Charlottetown, Prince Edward Island

Championship Game
Halifax 4 – St. John's 3
Halifax advances to Telus Cup

Quebec
Ligue de Hockey Midget AAA du Quebec Championship
Lions du Lac St-Louis vs Albatros du Collège Notre-Dame
Best-of-7 series played March 29-April 6, 2011
Game 1: Lac St-Louis 3 – Notre-Dame 2
Game 2: Lac St-Louis 5 – Notre-Dame 1
Game 3: Lac St-Louis 9 – Notre-Dame 4
Game 4: Notre-Dame 3 – Lac St-Louis 1
Game 5: Lac St-Louis 6 – Notre-Dame 1
Lac St-Louis wins series and advances to Telus Cup

Central Region
Tournament held March 28-April 2, 2011 at London, Ontario

Semi-finals
Ottawa 67's 5 – Mississauga 3
London 6 – Nickel City 2

Championship Game
London 3 – Ottawa 67's 1
London advances to Telus Cup

West Region
Tournament held March 31-April 3, 2011 at the Moose Jaw Civic Centre in Moose Jaw, Saskatchewan

Championship Game
Winnipeg 4 – Prince Albert 1
Winnipeg advances to Telus Cup

Pacific Region
Vancouver North West Giants vs Red Deer Rebels
Best-of-3 series played April 1–2, 2011
Game 1: Vancouver 7 – Red Deer 2
Game 2: Vancouver 3 – Red Deer 1
Vancouver wins series and advances to Telus Cup

See also
Telus Cup

References

External links
Hockey Canada
Midget AAA Telus Cup Regional Championship Website

Telus Cup
Telus Cup
Sport in St. John's, Newfoundland and Labrador
April 2011 sports events in Canada